John W. Tamblin (died May 25, 1874) was an American lawyer, newspaper editor and politician from New York.

Life
He was admitted to the bar in 1831, and practiced in Evans Mills, New York.

He was a member of the New York State Assembly (Jefferson County) in 1837 and 1842.

He was a member of the New York State Senate (21st District) in 1848 and 1849.

From December 1851 to March 1853, and again from September 1853 on, he co-published the Jeffersonian (a weekly paper) in Watertown.

He was buried at the Old Evans Mills Cemetery.

Sources
The New York Civil List compiled by Franklin Benjamin Hough (pages 136, 146, 219, 222, 226 and 308; Weed, Parsons and Co., 1858)
A History of Jefferson County by Franklin Benjamin Hough (Albany NY, 1854; pg. 375)

External links

Year of birth missing
1874 deaths
Democratic Party members of the New York State Assembly
Democratic Party New York (state) state senators
People from Jefferson County, New York